Vistra can refer to either of two companies:

Vistra (services company), a corporate services company based in Hong Kong;
Vistra Corp, an energy company based in Texas